The tubular heart or primitive heart tube is the earliest stage of heart development.

From the inflow to the outflow, it consists of sinus venosus, primitive atrium, the primitive ventricle, the bulbus cordis, and truncus arteriosus.

It forms primarily from splanchnic mesoderm. More specifically, they form from endocardial tubes, starting at day 21.

References

External links
 
 

Embryology of cardiovascular system